Andrés García Mohedano (born 11 May 1996) is a Spanish professional footballer who plays as a midfielder for CD Numancia.

Club career
Born in Madrid, García represented Getafe CF and Atlético Madrid as a youth, and made his senior debut with the latter's C-team in 2015, in Tercera División. On 1 September 2016, after one full campaign with the reserves also in the fourth division, he joined Segunda División B side La Roda CF on loan for one year.

In July 2017, García agreed to a deal with Granada CF and was assigned to the B-team also in the third division. On 23 July 2019, after being a regular starter for the Andalusians, he joined Segunda División side CD Mirandés on a two-year contract.

García made his professional debut on 17 August 2019, starting and scoring his team's second in a 2–2 away draw against Rayo Vallecano. The following 27 January, after featuring rarely, he was loaned to third division side FC Andorra for the remainder of the season.

On 22 January 2021, García terminated his contract with the Rojillos, and signed for third division side CD Numancia three days later.

References

External links

1996 births
Living people
Footballers from Madrid
Spanish footballers
Association football midfielders
Segunda División players
Segunda División B players
Tercera División players
Atlético Madrid C players
Atlético Madrid B players
La Roda CF players
Club Recreativo Granada players
CD Mirandés footballers
FC Andorra players
CD Numancia players